Sundanese may refer to:

 Sundanese people
 Sundanese language
 Sundanese script
 Sundanese (Unicode block)

See also
 
 Sunda (disambiguation)

Language and nationality disambiguation pages